Joe Laporte (31 March 1907 – 12 May 1983) was a Canadian cyclist. He competed in two events at the 1924 Summer Olympics and two events at the 1928 Summer Olympics.

References

External links
 

1907 births
1983 deaths
Canadian male cyclists
Olympic cyclists of Canada
Cyclists at the 1924 Summer Olympics
Cyclists at the 1928 Summer Olympics
Cyclists from Montreal
20th-century Canadian people